The Hemus motorway or Haemus motorway, designated A2, is a partially built motorway in Bulgaria. Its planned length is 418 km, of which 191 km are in operation . The motorway in operation is divided into two sections — the first one links the capital Sofia with Boaza near Yablanitsa, crossing Stara planina (Balkan mountains), and the second segment connects Varna and Buhovtsi near Targovishte. According to the plans, Hemus motorway would connect Sofia with the third-largest city of Varna, at the Black Sea coast, duplicating European route E70 (Varna–Shumen), European route E772 (Shumen–Yablanitsa) and European route E83 (Yablanitsa–Sofia).

History

October 4, 1974
The construction of the motorway officially began. The groundbreaking ceremony was attended by the First Secretary of the Bulgarian Communist Party (BCP), Todor Zhivkov.

1999
The Pravets–Yablanitsa section of the Hemus motorway was officially opened on 5 December 1999. Due to the mountainous terrain through the Balkans, the 5.47 km section together with another 16 km reconstructed, features two viaducts and one tunnel (Praveshki hanove), while the whole Sofia–Yablanitsa section has three more tunnels. The construction of the Pravets–Yablanitsa section began in 1984 but ceased in the late 1980s due to lack of funds to eventually be finished in 1998–1999.

2005
The 12.8 km section connecting Shumen with Kaspichan to the east was opened on 30 December 2005 and cost 77.6 million leva.

2013
 In July 2013 a segment of the motorway at Shumen opened.
 In August 2013 a 8.46 km segment, connecting the Sofia ring road and the Yana junction, opened to traffic.

2015
In August 2015, a 4.9 km segment, including the Belokopitovo interchange (with I-2 road), was inaugurated.

2019
In October 2019, а 9.3 km segment, connecting Yablanitsa with the I-4 road near the Boaza ravine of Vit, was inaugurated.

2022
In October 2022, а 16.3 km segment, connecting Belokopitovo with the village of Buhovtsi near Targovishte, was inaugurated.

Recent Developments
In January 2013 National Company "Strategic Infrastructure Projects" (NCSIP), a state-run company, tendered feasibility study for the remaining sections of Hemus motorway (Yablanitsa-Panayot Volovo). In 2014 NCSIP signed contracts for drawing conceptual designs for all 8 lots of the motorway. In January 2015, a tender for design and build of 2 lots, between Yablanitsa and the Pleven/Lovech road, has been announced by NCSIP. In 2016 NCSIP was closed, with all activities being transferred to the Roads Agency. The tender for construction of the Yablanitsa - Pleven/Lovech road was cancelled due to lack of secured financing and later in 2016 a new tender for a shorter 9 km stretch between Yablanitsa and Boaza has been announced.

Exits

Miscellaneous

 Bebresh Viaduct, regarded as the highest motorway bridge in the Balkans with a clearance of 120 m, is part of the Hemus motorway.
 The motorway is named after the Haemus Mons, an ancient name of the Balkan Mountains (Stara Planina).

Gallery

References

External links
 Hemus FS Summary .pdf at NCSIP (in Bulgarian)

Motorways in Bulgaria
Proposed roads in Bulgaria
Pan-European Corridor VIII